The 2018–19 Copa Catalunya season, is the 20th season of Copa Catalunya.

The All Star Game was played at Pavelló Nou Congost in Manresa.

Format

Regular season
28 teams are divided in two groups. The first round was on September 29, 2018.

Final stage
The Final Stage will be played in play-off ties in a two-legged format, with the exception of the final four.

Relegation PlayOffs
In the relegation playoffs, teams played against each other must win two games to win the series. The winners remain at Copa Catalunya for the next season.

Teams

Promotion and relegation (pre-season)
A total of 28 teams contest the league, including 18 sides from the 2017–18 season, three relegated from the 2017–18 EBA and seven promoted from the 2017–18 CC 1ªCategoria. On July 14, 2018, CB Salt achieved a vacant on Liga EBA. 

Teams relegated from Liga EBA
CB Salt
Camping Bianya Roser
CB Cantaires Tortosa
CB Cerdanyola al Dia

Teams promoted from CC 1ªCategoria
Lluïsos de Gràcia
Grupo Marthe UE Mataró B
CB Ripollet-Aíbaba Restaurant
A.E.S.E.
CB Castellar
UE Horta
Sant Gervasi
Sol Gironès Bisbal Bàsquet

Venues and locations

Regular season

Group 1

Group 2

Relegation PlayOffs
The first legs were played on 19 May 2019, the second legs on 26 May 2019 and the third legs, if necessary, on 2 June 2019.

|}

Final round

Quarter-finals
The first legs will be played on 18–19 May 2019, and the second legs will be played on 25–26 May 2019.

|}

Final Four
 
Games played at Pavelló Jaume Vilamajó in Calafell

Awards

Most Scorer of the Round

Regular season

All Star Game

The 2019 Copa Catalunya All-star event will be held on January 26, 2019 at Pavelló Nou Congost in Manresa.

The Black team won the game 94-91. The MVP of the game was Pedro Cuesta who scored 17 points along with 6 rebounds and Guillem Sánchez won the Slam Dunk Contest.

Rosters

Game

References and notes

Copa Catalunya
Copa Catalunya
Copa Catalunya